"Thank You" is a song performed by German singer Lena Meyer-Landrut. The song was released as a digital download on 16 November 2018 as the lead single from her fifth studio album Only Love, L (2019). The song peaked at number 40 on the German Singles Chart.

Music video
A music video to accompany the release of "Thank You" was first released onto YouTube on 29 November 2018. It was directed by Mario Clement.

Track listing

Charts

Certifications

Release history

References

2018 songs
2018 singles
Lena Meyer-Landrut songs
Universal Music Group singles
Songs written by Fraser T. Smith
Songs written by Jess Glynne
Songs written by Simon Triebel
Songs written by Jin Jin (musician)
Songs written by Lena Meyer-Landrut